Horslunde Church is a Church of Denmark parish church located in the village of Horslunde, on the island of Lolland, in southeastern Denmark. The altarpiece and the pulpit date from 1594. Former Danish prime minister, Christian Ditlev Frederik Reventlow is buried in the churchyard.

History
The church was in Catholic times dedicated to Saint lians. In 1379, Guds Legems Tjeneste in Horslunde Church is mentioned. Nothing is known about its ownership in the Middle Ages apart from the fact that the Crown had appointment rights to already prior to the Reformation. In 1686, it was presented to Peder Brandt  of Pederstrup Manor.

In 1725, it came under the authority of the county of Christianssæde when it  together with Pederstrup transferred to Christian Ditlev Reventlow. In 1819, Daniel Smith was appointed as parish priest of Horslunde-Nordlunde. In 1820, he was appointed as provost of Lollands Nørre Herred and in 1829 also of Lollands Søndre Herred. He maintained a close relationship with C. D. Reventlow. In 1834, he transferred to Stege on Møn. 

On 1 April 1031, it gained its independence.

Interior
Christian Ditlev Reventlow is buried inside the church. C.D.F. Reventlow, Frederik Reventlow, Frederikke Charlotte Reventlow are interred in the surrounding graveyard.

Churchyard
The surrounding churchuard is inusually large and has most likely been expanded in all directions.

Notable burials in the churchyard include:
 Christian Ditlev Frederik Reventlow (17481827), count and landowner 
 Frederik Reventlow (17471822), diplomat
 Frederikke Charlotte Reventlow (17271952), countess and writer
 Christian Stolberg (17481821), district governor, writer and translator 
 Louise Stolberg (17461824), saloniste, playwright and letter writer.

References 

Churches in Lolland
Buildings and structures in Lolland Municipality
Churches in the Diocese of Lolland–Falster
Buildings and structures associated with the Reventlow family